"Sorry" is the debut single by American singer and actress Naya Rivera featuring American rapper Big Sean. It was released on September 17, 2013. It is the only single to be released during Rivera's lifetime.

Background
In an interview with Billboard, Rivera spoke about the song saying "I wrote the song at the beginning of the summer along with some other songs... and this song just felt like a really good end-of-summer song, I wanted to get a feature on it, and it just felt like Sean's swag and his vibe would just really fit this well, and I was right."

Music video
A lyrical video of "Sorry" was released on September 17. Rivera enlisted a bevy of women to strip down for her NSFW black-and-white in the video which also features light projections.

Rivera talked about the lyrical video and its comparisons to Robin Thicke's "Blurred Lines" video:

Chart positions
The song made its debut in the Billboard U.S. Rhythmic chart charting at number 37. The song appeared in the UK Singles Chart and Irish Singles Chart charting at numbers 73 and 81, respectively. The song also charted at number 30 on Billboard's Pop Digital Tracks.

References

2013 debut singles
2013 songs
Big Sean songs
Naya Rivera songs
American contemporary R&B songs
Songs written by Big Sean
Columbia Records singles